Trip World is a 1992 platform video game developed and published by Sunsoft for the Game Boy.  It was released in Japan on November 27, 1992, and in Europe in 1993. The game's plot centers around the bunny-like being  and his quest to retrieve the flower of peace so that peace will return to Yakopoo's disarranged world. The protagonist's trademark ability is to shapeshift into different forms.

The game was re-released for the Nintendo 3DS Virtual Console in Japan on November 30, 2011, and in Europe January 5, 2012.

Gameplay

At first glance, Trip World appears to be a scaled-down version of Gimmick!, another Sunsoft game released in the same year.  In Trip World, the player controls Yakopoo through five relatively large and slightly linear stages. They include areas such as a mountain, a jungle, the ocean and a castle. The stages also feature some secret passages and divergent paths. The objective is to find the stolen flower of peace, since the inhabitants of Trip World turned mad because of its absence, acting as the enemies in the game. At the end of each world, Yakopoo faces a boss, in the fifth and last world the player has to defeat multiple bosses in a row in order to complete the game. There are also a few mini-bosses in certain parts of the stages.

Yakopoo is able to shapeshift between three different primary forms at any time, these forms are manually activated by the player when desired. In his normal form, he is able to walk and to jump and can attack enemies by kicking them. When Yakopoo's ears transform into wings, he is able to fly in a limited way. This form doesn't allow to fly completely freely through a stage due to gravity, and since the player isn't able to change direction during flight, and Yakopoo always falls down when he touches a wall. In the third form, Yakopoo resembles a fish. While he can't move on the ground, the fish-like Yakopoo is able to swim well and attack enemies with foam in water. Beneath these three forms, Yakopoo also occasionally shapeshifts into other special forms which can't be manually activated or deactivated by the player. By picking up special power-ups, Yakopoo turns into forms such as Flower Yakopoo (stunning enemies with seeds) or Tail Yakopoo (tail attack with long range) for a short time.

The player's character has four health points and loses them by touching spikes or when being hit by enemy attacks. Unlike many other platform games, most of the enemies in Trip World don't hurt the player's character on touch.  Many benign enemies will become violent if attacked by Yakopoo however.  Most of them just push Yakopoo around when not angered, while other enemies are able to attack in certain manners and do so freely. All bosses are able to hurt Yakopoo. The player loses a life when all health points are gone.

Plot
The game is set in Trip World, a peaceful world where Yakopoo lives. He is a young member of the Shabubu race of bunny-like beings. Yakopoo lives with his grandfather, an old Shabubu, on the holy mountain known as Mount Dubious, where the Maita Flower is found. The named flower is the flower of peace and is deemed to have supernatural powers. Because of this, it is usually protected by Yakopoo's grandpa, so that it won't fall in the wrong hands. However, one day mysterious shadowy creatures appear, attack Yakopoo's grandfather and steal the flower of peace.

Since the Maita Flower has been removed from its place, the peace is gone and the inhabitants of Trip World get mad and don't stop quarreling with each other. In order to save his world, Yakopoo sets out to find the thieves and to return the Maita Flower. In the game's last stage, Mirror Land, it turns out that the King of Mirror Land, a Shabubu himself, and his minions stole the flower. After Yakopoo defeats the King's minions and the King who fights Yakopoo in a robot, the Queen appears who hid with the Maita Flower during the fight. The King was actually possessed by a flower of unknown origin on his head which now disappears after his defeat. The King turns good again, Yakopoo's grandfather returns the flower to the holy mountain and the peace is back in Trip World.

Reception and legacy

The German magazine ASM rated the game an overall score of 9 out of 12. The reviewer stated that Trip World is "in any case a treat for action fans". Video Games, another German magazine, rated the game a score of 68%. The magazine referred to Trip World as a "better" platform game and lauded its graphics and music. The review's author commented that Trip World is "ideally suited" for inexperienced players due to its low level of difficulty. Video Games also praised the "clear game structure", but criticized the "missing lasting appeal" for experienced players. Hardcore Gaming 101 praised the game's visuals stating it has one of the best visuals on the Game Boy. However, also criticized the game for being too easy.  Marcel van Duyn of Nintendo Life was impressed with the visuals as well, but found the simplicity of the gameplay and the game's length to be lacking. Van Duyn therefore recommended Gimmick! instead, citing it as a game that was somewhat similar but did everything better.

Yakopoo later appeared in Sunsoft's fighting game, Galaxy Fight: Universal Warriors as a mini-boss and with a more detailed look. His name is romanized "Yacopu" in this game. According to game's plot, he is the pet of Galaxy Fights final boss, Rouwe.  Similar to some other transforming characters from other one-on-one fighting games like Geegus from World Heroes and Shang Tsung from the Mortal Kombat series for example, Yakopoo has the ability to shapeshift himself into whoever he fights against, providing a mirror match. While in his regular form, he can only be hit by crouching attacks while on the ground. Also, he does his signature kicks he used in Trip World. The background music played in his stage is an arranged version of the background music heard during the second to last boss fight in Trip World.

Yakopoo makes an unnamed appearance as a minor character in 2019's Blaster Master Zero 2, an entry in Sunsoft's Blaster Master series developed and published by Inti Creates. Here, he is presented as an assistant creature accompanying the Metal Attacker "EIR" and its pilots Kanna and Kenwood. When protagonists Jason Frudnick and Eve arrive on the planet Stranga, Yakopoo is fed a variety of fruits that Jason is sent to collect and produces a medicine for Eve that alleviates the effects of the environment on her. Other references to Trip World can be found on the planet, such as flowers blooming from enemy mutants in reference to the Flower Yakopoo power-up.

Notes

References

External links
Official 3DS Virtual Console webpage 

1992 video games
Fantasy video games
Game Boy games
Platform games
Sunsoft games
Video games about plants
Video games about rabbits and hares
Video games about shapeshifting
Video games developed in Japan
Virtual Console games
Virtual Console games for Nintendo 3DS